Dynamo Berlin may refer to:
 SC Dynamo Berlin, a multi-sports club in East Berlin from 1954 to 1991
 Berliner FC Dynamo, an association football club separated out of SC Dynamo Berlin in 1966 and still extant